Gerald Cardinale (February 27, 1934 – February 20, 2021) was an American Republican Party politician, who served in the New Jersey State Senate from 1982 until his death in 2021, representing the 39th Legislative District.  He also served one term in the New Jersey General Assembly from 1980 until 1982. At the time of his death, he was the second-most senior senator in the state, behind Richard Codey, who also came to office in January 1982, but had served in the General Assembly since 1974.  Cardinale was a delegate to the Republican National Convention in 1984, 1988 and 1992 and served as a Delegate to the New Jersey Republican State Platform Committee in 1983.

Early life 
Cardinale was born in Brooklyn on February 27, 1934.  He studied chemistry at St. John's University, obtaining Bachelor of Science in 1955.  He subsequently earned a D.D.S. from the New York University College of Dentistry in 1959.  He was a dentist by profession, and he had an office in Fort Lee, New Jersey.  He resided in Demarest, where he served as mayor from 1975 to 1979.  He was also a trustee of the Demarest Public Schools Board of Education from 1967 to 1973, serving as its president from 1969 to 1971.

Political career

New Jersey Assembly 
Before his service as State Senator, Cardinale spent one term in the lower house of the New Jersey Legislature, the General Assembly, from 1980 to 1981.

New Jersey Senate 
Cardinale served in the State Senate as deputy majority leader from 1994 to 2001, as majority whip from 1992 to 1993, as assistant minority leader from 1987 to 1989 and as minority whip from 1985 to 1986. He served in the Senate on the Commerce Committee, the Judiciary Committee and the Legislative Oversight Committee.

Tenure 
In 2018 Cardinale sponsored a bill alongside Senators Paul Sarlo, Kristin Corrado, Loretta Weinberg, and Joseph Lagana that would push a special election to the following year if a vacancy for the County Sheriff, Clerk, or Surrogate posts if the vacancy occurs 70 days before election day. In March 2019 Cardinale expressed his opposition to marijuana legalization. He called the social justice argument in favor of legalization "B.S." as well as saying it wouldn't solve the budget problems that those in favor of legalization have argued.

Committee assignments 
Commerce 
Judiciary

Campaign for Congress 
After  Congresswoman Marge Roukema announced her retirement in 2002, she endorsed Cardinale as her successor in the Republican primary.  However, Cardinale finished with 25%, a close third behind State Assemblyman Scott Garrett (the eventual winner, with 45%) and David C. Russo (who received 26% of votes cast).

Personal life
Cardinale married Carole Petrullo in 1959.  They attended the same preschool in Brooklyn, but only reconnected years later when three friends set them up on blind dates.  They remained married for 62 years until his death.  Together, they had five children: Marisa, Christine, Kara, Gary, and Nicole.

Cardinale died on the morning of February 20, 2021, at the Pascack Valley Medical Center in Westwood, New Jersey.  He was 86, and suffered a brief illness prior to his death that was not related to COVID-19.  At the time of his death, he was running for re-election to a thirteenth term in the state senate. Cardinale's funeral was on February 24 at Our Lady of Mount Carmel Church in Tenafly, New Jersey. He was laid to rest at Brookside Cemetery in Englewood, New Jersey.

Electoral history

New Jersey Senate

2017 
In 2017 Cardinale faced a challenge from Democrat Linda H. Schwager and Libertarian James Tosone. In his second closest election in that district since 1981 he beat Schwager by over 4,000 votes. Cardinale won Bergen, and Passaic Counties by about 4,000 and 2,000 votes respectively.

2013 
In a year that was good, electorally, for incumbent State Senate Republicans, Cardinale won re-election by over 16,000 votes, and finishing with more than 60% of the vote in Bergen and Passaic Counties.

2011 
2011 re-redistricting put part of Passaic County in the district. Democrats nominated Lorraine M. Waldes. Cardinale easily defeated Waldes.

2007 
In his second closest election since 1981 at that point, Cardinale defeated Democratic nominee Joseph Ariyan by 5,000 votes.

2003 
During the 2003 general election in New Jersey Democrats gained a majority in the State Senate for the first time since 1992, however Cardinale still won re-election easily.

2001 
In 2001, Republicans lost two seats in the State Senate making the partisan makeup a 20–20 split. Republicans lost the Governorship with the retirement of Governor Donald DiFrancesco and the election of James McGreevey. Regardless, Cardinale won re-election in the then-safe Republican 39th District.

1997 
In 1997 Incumbent Republican Governor Christine Todd Whitman barely squeaked out a re-election win over State Senator and Woodbridge Township Mayor James McGreevey, Cardinale, who at this point was still serving as Deputy Majority Leader under the leadership of Majority Leader John O. Bennett and Senate President Donald DiFrancesco, cruised to re-election.

1993 
Cardinale who was serving as Majority Whip easily beat Democratic nominee Stephen Jaffe.

1991 
In the 1991 election, Republicans gained an overwhelming Majority in the State Senate. Cardinale was made Majority Whip following the election.

1987 
Cardinale easily won re-election to a third term in 1987.

1983 
In what was Cardinale's closest election since 1981 he faced now former State Senator Francis X. Herbert, who lost by a little under 2,000 votes.

1981 
Then an Assemblyman, Cardinale ran for State Senate for the first time against incumbent Democratic State Senator Frank Herbert, Cardinale beat him by a wide margin.

New Jersey Assembly

1979 
In 1979 Cardinale, again ran for General Assembly this time he won coming in first place.

1977 
In 1977 Cardinale ran for General Assembly losing to Incumbent Harold Martin and newcomer Greta Kiernan.

United States House of Representatives

New Jersey Governor

References

External links

 Senator Gerald Cardinale's Official Site
 Senator Cardinale's legislative web page, New Jersey Legislature
 New Jersey Legislature financial disclosure forms
 2016 2015 2014 2013 2012 2011 2010 2009 2008 2007 2006 2005 2004
 Gerry Cardinale campaign website
 Senator S. Gerald Cardinale, Project Vote Smart

|-

1934 births
2021 deaths
20th-century American politicians
21st-century American politicians
American dentists
Mayors of places in New Jersey
Republican Party members of the New Jersey General Assembly
Republican Party New Jersey state senators
New York University College of Dentistry alumni
People from Demarest, New Jersey
Politicians from Bergen County, New Jersey
Politicians from Brooklyn
School board members in New Jersey
St. John's University (New York City) alumni